The 2014–15 season was Blackpool F.C.s fourth-consecutive season in the Football League Championship, the second tier of English professional football, and their 106th overall season in the Football League. They exited the League Cup at the first-round stage on 12 August and the FA Cup, also at the first hurdle, on 4 January. They were relegated to League One with six League fixtures remaining.

José Riga, in his first season as manager, was in charge for fourteen League games, before being sacked on 27 October with the club five points adrift at the foot of the table. Lee Clark succeeded him three days later. Clark, too, departed shortly after the season's conclusion.

Season summary

Pre-season
Barry Ferguson, Blackpool's caretaker player-manager for the final twenty league games of the previous campaign, was not given the role full-time and left the club. Including Ferguson, Blackpool released 17 players, while five loan players returned to their parent clubs.

On 11 June Belgian José Riga was appointed as Blackpool's new manager. He was their first from overseas and their third full-time manager in two years. Blackpool had stated they would discuss contract terms with nine out of contract professionals, but of those only Tony McMahon signed a new deal to return to the club. Among the departees were Matt Gilks, the club's only remaining goalkeeper and player from their 2010–11 Premier League campaign, and Tom Ince, whose father, Paul, had been sacked as manager during the previous season. July. The Ince fee was decided by a tribunal, because Ince was under the age of 23, with the same rules applying in the case of Harrison McGahey, a scholar who made his professional debut the previous season, who also left the club, joining Sheffield United.

By 1 July, the day after pre-season training was due to begin, the club had just seven registered players. The decision was made to delay training until 3 July. The same day, Estonian striker Sergei Zenjov became the club's first signing of the close season. On 19 July Blackpool played their opening friendly at Penrith, winning 4–0 with a team of professionals, youth players and trialists. Their pre-season trip to Spain was cancelled on 15 July.

Eight days before their second and final friendly, at home to Premier League newcomers Burnley, the club still only had eight registered professionals. José Riga and chairman Karl Oyston were reported to be locked in a standoff over transfers. Riga also implemented a media blackout for himself and his staff, and had not spoken to the press since his appointment 44 days earlier.

On 24 July, in an open letter to club owner Owen Oyston and his son, club president Valeri Belokon demanded funds be put aside for player acquisitions. Three players were signed on 28 July, with a further three joining by 1 August. In their home friendly against Burnley on 2 August, Blackpool again fielded a host of trialists both in their starting line-up and on the bench, as the visitors won 1–0.

Between 3–8 August Blackpool added six further players to their squad, including goalkeepers Joe Lewis and Ell Parish. When midfielder Andrea Orlandi became Blackpool's 20th squad member on 8 August, the day before the start of the season, he was also their twelfth in as many days.

Regular season
On 9 August Blackpool lost their opening match of the season to Nottingham Forest.  Blackpool had squad problems prior to the match; they had only nine players who "qualified" earlier in the day. They ultimately fielded 15 in their matchday squad, including two 17-year–old scholars from the youth academy. One of them, Dom Telford, was offered professional terms after his debut. A week later, in the first home league game of the new season, new signing Tomasz Cywka scored the club's first goal of the campaign in a 2–1 defeat to Blackburn. The club has continued to make acquisitions and by 16 August the signing of Edu Oriol saw the first-team squad reach 26 players. On 30 August, defeat to Millwall, managed by former Blackpool boss Ian Holloway, saw the club go without a point in five games in August.

On 13 September, Blackpool gained their first point in their sixth league game of the season, a goalless draw with Wolves at Bloomfield Road. They would have to wait until 3 October for their first win, a 1–0 defeat of Cardiff in their 11th league game. However, this was followed by three consecutive losses, after which Riga was sacked on 27 October and replaced two days later by Lee Clark. The former Birmingham manager lost his first game, 2–0 at home to Ipswich on 1 December, but secured his first point with a 2–2 draw at Fulham four days later. However, on 1 December Blackpool lost 3–1 at Leeds, meaning they had lost 12, drawn four and won only one of their first 17 league fixtures.

Successive draws with Bolton and Rotherham followed the defeat to Leeds, before Clark sealed his first win in his sixth game in charge, a 1–0 home defeat of his former club Birmingham City on 6 December. Blackpool extended their undefeated run with a 2–2 draw at Charlton a week later. However, the following game they lost 6–1 at home to Bournemouth.

Having secured a point from two games over the Christmas period, on 10 January 2015, their first league game of the year, Blackpool sealed their third win of the season, defeating Holloway's Millwall at home. Away defeats followed, 2–0 at Wolves and 7–2 at Watford, having been 2–0 up, before they secured what proved to be their fourth and last win of the campaign against Brighton on 31 January. 17-year-old Henry Cameron made his professional debut in the 1–0 win, becoming the 44th player used by the club that season.

Consecutive defeats to Norwich and Middlesbrough followed, before a 4–4 draw with Nottingham Forest on Valentine's Day, their first such result in 2,252 home league games. A 1–1 draw at local rivals Blackburn came a week later before Blackpool embarked on a six-match losing run (scoring one goal in the process) by which point they had lost the equivalent of one full league season (46 games) out of the last two played, with eight games remaining of 2014–15.

On 21 March, Blackpool ended their run with a 1–1 home draw with Leeds, the first of three consecutive draws. On 6 April, the day before the third of these, they were officially relegated. Another run of four defeats followed, ending with their last away game of the season, the 3–2 defeat to Cardiff confirming they would not win away from Bloomfield Road all season, thus equalling a record from their 1908–09 campaign.

On 2 May 2015, the final day of the Championship season, Blackpool's home game against Huddersfield Town was abandoned after 48 minutes following a pitch invasion by Blackpool fans in protest at chairman Karl Oyston. The score was 0–0 at the time, and that's how the Football League declared it to subsequently stand. It was Blackpool's 18th-consecutive game without a victory and their points tally of 26 was the lowest in the English second tier since Stockport County picked up the same number of points when they finished bottom in the 2001-02 season.

Over the last two full league seasons played, Blackpool had claimed 11 wins from 92 games.

League Cup
Blackpool exited the League at the first-round stage after a single-goal defeat at Shrewsbury Town, managed by former Seasiders captain Micky Mellon, on 12 August. Two players, Jeffrey Rentmeister and Joël Dielna, played having signed earlier in the day.

FA Cup
On 4 January, Blackpool lost their FA Cup third round tie against Premier League club Aston Villa 1–0, with Christian Benteke scoring two minutes before the end of normal time. It was Blackpool's seventh exit at their first FA Cup hurdle in eight seasons.

Players

First-team squad

No. = Squad number

Pos = Playing position

P = Number of games played

G = Number of goals scored

GK = Goalkeeper

DF = Defender

MF = Midfielder

FW = Forward

 Loan player

YTH = Youth team players named in first-team squad

L = Ended the season out on loan

Players used: 56
Goals scored: 36 (all in the league)

Results

Pre-season and friendlies

The Championship

League Cup

FA Cup

Table

Transfers
Blackpool released 17 players at the start of the season, while eight more rejected the offers of new contracts. Their contracted players at the start of pre-season were Tom Barkhuizen, Steven Davies, Charles Dunne, Bobby Grant, Gary MacKenzie, Tony McMahon and David Perkins. Blackpool signed 42 players over the course of the season, 26 as contracted players and 16 on loan. Of those signed to contracts, seven would depart permanently before the end of the season.

In

Out

Academy
Blackpool gave debuts to academy scholars Henry Cameron, Bright Osayi-Samuel, Dom Telford and Mark Waddington over the course of the season, with Cameron signing a professional deal in January. Fellow youth-team players Miles Boney, Luke Higham and Daniel Milton were unused substitutes for the first-team.

References

Blackpool F.C. seasons
Blackpool